A list of films produced by the Tollywood (Bengali language film industry) based in Kolkata in the year 1964.

A-Z of films

References

"Aarohi" I saw it in 1964 (ref: My diary of 1964, on Wednesday 18 Nov)

I have also noted in this diary that I saw the following movies in Bengali this year:

Prabhater Rang;
Momer Alo;
Deep nebhe nai;
Mahatirtha Kalighat ;
Lalpathar (saw twice);
Bakso-Badal;
Palatak;

External links
 Tollywood films of 1964 at the Internet Movie Database

1964
Bengali
Films, Bengali